Rimini is an Adriatic coast city in Italy.

Rimini may also refer to:

Places 
 Rimini, Montana, a ghost town in the U.S.
 Rimini, South Carolina an unincorporated community in South Carolina, U.S.
 Roman Catholic Diocese of Rimini

Music
 Rimini (album), by Fabrizio De André
 Rimini (film), 2022 film directed by Ulrich Seidl

Other uses
 A.C. Rimini 1912, an Italian association football club
 Gregory of Rimini (c. 1300–1358), a scholastic philosopher
 "Rimini," a poem by Rudyard Kipling
 Rimini (film), a 2022 film

See also 
 Angeli–Rimini reaction
 La Spezia–Rimini Line
 Battle of Rimini (disambiguation)
 Remini